The Karen Demirchyan Yerevan Subway (Karen Demirchyani anvan Yerevani metropoliten; since December 1999), colloquially known as the Yerevan Metro, is a rapid transit system that serves the capital of Armenia, Yerevan. Opened on 7 March 1981, it was the eighth metro system in the former Soviet Union. Owned by the government, it is operated by the Karen Demirchyan Yerevan Subway CJSC of the Ministry of Transport and Communication.

Unlike most former Soviet rapid transit systems, its stations are not very deep: there are two stations above ground, one sub-surface, and the remaining stations are considered deep-level. Only three stations are deeper than : Marshal Baghramyan (approximately ), Barekamutyun (approximately ) and Yeritasardakan (approximately ). Stations are intricately decorated with national motifs. The metro runs along  of track, and currently serves ten active stations.

History
Yerevan, the capital of Armenia, experienced substantial growth during the postwar period when it was the capital of the Armenian SSR. Due to the city's very uneven landscape, only an underground system could meet all of the criteria to efficiently move large numbers of people around the city. The first plans for a rapid transit system began to be formed in the late 1960s, under the auspices of Anton Kochinyan, then the first secretary of the Communist Party of Armenia. Initially, this was centred on a rapid tram system, rather than a full underground metro system. During this time, the Soviet City Engineering Planning Department clearly stated that a Metro system would only be awarded to cities with more than a population of one million, which Yerevan lacked at the start of construction (1972). Nevertheless, all of the tunnels in which the tram lines were to be installed were built to a design that would have allowed a potential conversion into a full underground metro system.

The engineering work was of such high quality that during the 1988 Armenian earthquake the Metro managed to withstand the earthquake which paralyzed the whole republic and continued to operate the next day with only minor damage. However, this did put an end to most of the extension projects as finances were diverted to the reconstruction of the destroyed infrastructure elsewhere in Yerevan and Armenia.

On 28 December 1999, the Metro was named after Karen Demirchyan, the man who was responsible for changing the status of the Rapid Tram system into becoming a Metro system, after he was killed two months earlier in a terrorist attack on the Armenian parliament.

Timeline

Name changes

Following the dissolution of the USSR and the independence of Armenia, three stations saw their names changed in 1992. A fourth station had been renamed ten years before, to honour Ivan Khristoforovich Bagramyan, a Soviet military commander of Armenian origin, after his death.

Facts and numbers

It served about 60,000 passengers per day before a fare increase, In 2012, 14.9 million passengers rode the metro. but ridership fell by almost 20% to 50,000 passengers per day after the doubling of the fare. The system employs about 1,200 workers. A peculiar feature of the metro is that the digital timers/clocks count up, i.e. they reset to "00:00" when a train departs, and keep counting up until the next train leaves. Passengers must be aware that trains, in general, arrive/depart every 5 minutes or so.

Due to Yerevan's uneven landscape, the metro in some cases goes above ground. Of the ten stations; seven are underground of which one is a single-vault shallow level, and the rest are pylon deep-level stations. Continuing the tradition of all ex-Soviet underground systems, most of the stations are exquisitely decorated, often blending Armenian national motifs with late-Soviet architecture.

When the system opened it initially had no depot, and service bays in the reversal sidings were used to make minor repairs instead. The proper depot Charbakh was opened in 1985 as part of the second extension. In the early 1990s, the metro system had a total of 70 cars (all of them Metrovagonmash 81-717/81-714 models) forming approximately 12 three-carriage trains. However, since then the intermediate carriages were sold to the Moscow and Saint-Petersburg systems in return for overhaul repairs on the driving cars (which Charbakh has no facility or apparatus to perform).

In 2000–2001, for economic reasons, all of the intermediate 81-714 carriages stopped operating and the system currently has only 13 81-717 two-carriage trains running, (12 on the main line, one on the shuttle service).
The annual budget for Yerevan Metro in 2002 was 1 billion 440 million drams (about $2.5 million). Of this amount, about 800 million drams were financed by the State. The rest of the budget was allocated from ticket costs, trade and advertisement. A ride on the Yerevan Metro currently costs 100 drams (about 25 cents).

In 2012–2014 81-717 carriages were refurbished. After the refurbishment trains were given the same exterior and interior as the 81-71M trains in Prague.

Plans

Despite the optimism of the growing city (which did reach one million in 1986), today the Metro is underfunded and does not form the main transport artery of the city. It has had practically no extensions since 1989 (albeit a small shuttle service to a single-platform station in Charbakh). In the city budget, which is still having to make provisions for the repair of the damage done in the horrendous 1988 earthquake, the metro lacks priority. The next extension will be to the Achapnyak and Nazarbekyan stations (the construction of which has been frozen since the early 1990s).

Moreover, since the Metro did not manage to connect the important residential districts before the earthquake and the economic crises that took place following the nation's declaration of independence, minibus routes have taken over as the backbone of Yerevan's urban transport, often doubling the Metro routes. In 2004, the annual ridership numbers were 12.1 million. This trend, however, has reversed in recent years as the city's congested road arteries have encouraged commuters to see the metro as a quick, clean and affordable transit alternative. As of 2016, the annual ridership of the metro had increased to 15.4 million annual passengers. By 2017, the annual ridership increased to 16.2 million passengers. By 2019, ridership further increased to 20.2 million annual passengers.

Although the current building progress is distant, there are plans for a second and third line to eventually open, forming a typical Soviet triangle design layout of six radii, intersecting in the city centre. It was reported in March 2013 that city officials were approaching banks to seek loans for an expansion of the Yerevan Metro system. In 2018, Armen Gularyan the deputy chairman of Armenia's Urban Development Committee discussed the possibility of constructing another subway station on the already existing line. This proposed stop, between the Sasuntsi David and Andranik stations, would offer direct access to the Surmalu and Petak shopping malls. It is unclear whether this proposal will be included in the new metro extension plan.

On 15 May 2019, the chief architect of Yerevan confirmed that plans are now underway to begin the expansion of the Yerevan metro. He expressed hope that the design works of the new subway station in the Ajapnyak District will be completed shortly and that construction works will launch in early 2020. Also in 2019, the Mayor of Yerevan Hayk Marutyan announced that the preliminary stages have begun to extend the metro northward to Davtashen District.

Renovation 

The Yerevan Metro was thoroughly renovated for the first time since its founding 30 years ago, with funds of about $41 million allotted by the European Union.  A drainage system construction, one of the preconditions for the underground's security will be done first. Additionally, with the assistance of the European Bank for Reconstruction and Development, tunnels were upgraded, metro cars were renovated and new logistical equipment was installed. The renovation was fully finished by 2012.

Tokens 
Rather than tickets, passengers are sold tokens, which are then used to operate turnstiles to reach station platforms. The orange plastic tokens issued since 2009 depict the metro's logo on one side and the city's statue of David of Sassoun on the other.

Network map

See also

 List of metro systems
 Transport in Armenia
 Trolleybuses in Yerevan

References

External links
 
 

 

 
Transport in Yerevan
Buildings and structures in Yerevan
Underground rapid transit in Armenia
Railway lines opened in 1981
825 V DC railway electrification
Rapid transit in Armenia
1981 establishments in Armenia